is a 1985 manga series by Masami Yuki (best known for his manga and anime series Mobile Police Patlabor). The main character is a young would-be idol singer and high school student, Maron Namikaze, who has superhuman strength. She battles a mecha organization, Demon Seed, which has been terrorizing Tokyo. The manga was adapted into a 2 episode anime OVA in 1989. The series is a parody of Japanese pop culture.

Three CDs were released: a single on September 20, 1989, an image soundtrack on October 25, 1989, and a concert CD March 5, 1990.

Plot
In near-future Tokyo, a group called the Demon Seed has been antagonizing the city with its thefts and giant robotic Power Suits. After various failed attempts against the Demon Seed, the Special Operations Anti-Demon Seed Team (five men in a downtown office) begins to look for an idol to pilot a robotic suit against the Demon Seed. A talent show is held; and after a particularly dull line-up of contestants, the extremely strong Maron Namikaze is discovered. She is fitted with a metal costume and sent to take the Demon Seed down, all the while having an idol singer career forced upon her.

Characters
Maron Namikaze: The 13-year-old protagonist. She is very timid and nervous, but has been gifted with immense natural strength. Maron is trained to become a J-Pop idol and becomes popular enough to be entered for the Newcomer's Award in the music awards. For the American DVD release, Maron was claimed to be a high school senior, even in the subtitles. .
Chief Hattori: The leader of the Special Operations team, later Maron's manager and coach. He wrote and submitted the Idol Project plans when he was drunk, and later to his chagrin, it was approved. Hattori was slightly modelled after Masami Yuki's editor at the time. .
Dr. Ryouhei Shimokobe: The dwarf-sized researcher whom created Maron's costume. Before he knew the idol was a girl, he created a Patlabor-esque robot, which he later gave to the Demon Seed. He is very arrogant and proud of his work, soon becoming disgusted when Maron is converted into a singer instead of a fighter. .
Professor Kyozaburo Demon: The leader of the Demon Seed. Very confident with his work, he believes the group can spend as much money as they want, thinking they can get more at any time. However, he runs out of money to fix the Power Suits after Maron's first interference, and takes the Demon Seed into hiding for a few months. .
Kagiri Sonoba: An idol singer known for her provocative costumes. She gets into a one-sided rivalry with Maron after both girls turn out to be competing for the Newcomer's Award.

Music
The opening theme, had lyrics by and was composed by Kyōko Matsumiya, was arranged by Kohei Tanaka, and had vocals by Hiroko Kasahara, the voice actor for Maron. The first ending theme, had lyrics and vocals by Kasahara, was composed by Matsumiya, and was arranged by Tanaka. The second ending theme, had lyrics by and was composed by Matsumiyam was arranged by Tanaka, and had vocals by Kasahara.

There were four insert songs:
: Lyrics and composition by Matsumiya, arrangement by Tanaka, vocals by Kasahara
: Lyrics by Yoshiko Oga, composition and arrangement by Tanaka, vocals by Maria Kawamura
: Lyrics, composition, and vocals by Masayuki Yamamoto, arrangement by Tanaka
"Love & Power": Lyrics and composition by Matsumiya, arrangement by Tanaka, vocals by Kasahara

Album releases
Three albums were released through Warner Bros. Japan:
A theme song single titled  was released on September 25, 1989 on cassette tape and as a CD single. 
The  was released on October 25, 1989. 
The third album, was released on March 25, 1990.

Reception 
Helen McCarthy in 500 Essential Anime Movies stated that the OVA "remains an enjoyable bit of nonsense, with some of the biggest names on the anime scene on the crew list."

References

External links
 

1985 manga
1989 anime OVAs
Masami Yuki